Tickling is the act of touching a part of the body lightly so as to cause involuntary laughter or contraction of the muscles.

Tickle, tickles, or tickling may also refer to:

 Tickle (surname), a list of people with the surname Tickle
 Mr. Tickle, a book by Roger Hargreaves
 Tickle the Doodat, a character from the Hooley Dooleys
 Tickle.com, a former interpersonal media company providing self-discovery and social networking services
 Trout tickling, a method of fishing by hand
 Titanium tetrachloride, a chemical compound (TiCl4)
 Tcl, a pronunciation of the name of the scripting language
 Gudgudee, a 1997 Indian film that translates as Tickle
 Tickle (TV series), a TV series named after Steven Ray Tickle
Tickled, a 2016 documentary by David Farrier
 "Tickles" (song), a song by Swedish singer Elin Lanto
 Tickling fetishism, a type of fetish involving light touching

Newfoundland
A tickle is a short narrow strait in Newfoundland English that refers to:
 Tickles, Newfoundland and Labrador, a small settlement
 Leading Tickles, a town in Newfoundland and Labrador
 Tickle Bay, somewhere off the island of Newfoundland

See also
 Tickell
 List of tickles